</noinclude>

Julian Fletcher Dunn-Johnson (born July 11, 2000) is a Canadian professional soccer player who plays as a centre-back for HamKam in the Eliteserien.

Club career

Toronto FC II 
On June 29, 2017, Dunn joined USL club Toronto FC II on loan. He made his debut in a 4–3 defeat to the Harrisburg City Islanders on July 1. Dunnwas sent off for the first time in his career during a 3–1 defeat at the Bethlehem Steel on August 13.

Toronto FC 
On April 13, 2018, Dunn signed as a homegrown player with MLS side Toronto FC. In doing so, he became the 18th homegrown player to sign for the first team from the academy, and the sixth player to complete the club's full player pathway. The following day, Dunn made his debut as a 76th minute substitute in a 2–0 defeat to the Colorado Rapids. Dunn would have his option for the 2020 season exercised by Toronto, keeping him with the club. He has been loaned to the second team on occasion.

On August 10, 2020, Dunn was loaned to Canadian Premier League side Valour FC. He made his debut for Valour on August 16 against Cavalry FC. Dunn played every single minute for Valour in the 2020 season, and his solid performances for the club were recognized as he was nominated for the league's U21 Canadian Player of the Year Award, which was eventually won by Mohamed Farsi.

Upon his return to Toronto for the 2021 MLS season, Dunn featured sparingly due to a number of injuries, ultimately only making two appearances for the first team throughout the year. Upon the conclusion of the season, his contract expired and Dunn departed the club.

HamKam
In December 2021, Eliteserien club HamKam announced they had signed Dunn on a two-year deal. He made his debut for HamKam in their season-opener against Lillestrøm on April 2, 2022. In late May, he suffered a season ending injury.

International career

Youth

In April 2017, Dunn-Johnson was named in Canada's 20-man squad for the 2017 CONCACAF Under-17 Championship. He made his international debut in a 2–1 defeat to Costa Rica on April 22. He made two further appearances in the competition against Cuba and Suriname. In May 2018, Dunn-Johnson was named to Canada's under-21 squad for the 2018 Toulon Tournament. He was named to the Canadian U20 team for the 2018 CONCACAF U-20 Championship on October 24, 2018. Dunn-Johnson was named to the Canadian U-23 provisional roster for the 2020 CONCACAF Men's Olympic Qualifying Championship on February 26, 2020.

He also qualifies for Jamaica as his father was born in Saint Mary and his mother in Hanover.

Career statistics

Club

References

External links
 
 

2000 births
Living people
Canadian soccer players
Canadian sportspeople of Jamaican descent
Black Canadian soccer players
Association football defenders
Homegrown Players (MLS)
Major League Soccer players
Soccer players from Toronto
Toronto FC players
Toronto FC II players
Valour FC players
Hamarkameratene players
League1 Ontario players
USL Championship players
USL League One players
Eliteserien players
Canadian Premier League players
Canadian expatriate soccer players
Expatriate footballers in Norway
Canadian expatriate sportspeople in Norway
Vaughan Azzurri players